Nopparat Rajathanee Hospital is a hospital located in Khan Na Yao District, Bangkok, Thailand. It is a main teaching hospital for the College of Medicine, Rangsit University. It is also an affiliated teaching hospital of the Faculty of Medicine Siriraj Hospital, Mahidol University, the Faculty of Medicine, Srinakharinwirot University and Phramongkutklao College of Medicine.

History 
In 1967, due to the rapid population growth of the Bangkok Metropolitan Area, a suburban hospital was proposed in order to increase healthcare access to the people. This "Bangkok Suburban Hospital" Project was approved in 1972 and construction preparations began in 1973. Construction was halted in 1974 due to a change in department policy and was restarted in 1977. The outpatient department opened on 2 January 1982 and the inpatient department opened on 1 October that same year. The hospital was named Nopparat Rajathanee Hospital by King Bhumibol Adulyadej. 

Over the years, Nopparat Rajathanee Hospital has been affiliated to many medical schools throughout Thailand. However in 2021, the hospital cooperated with the College of Medicine, Rangsit University to provide medical education where students would be mainly based here.

See also 
 Health in Thailand
 Hospitals in Thailand
 List of hospitals in Thailand

References 

Hospitals in Bangkok
Teaching hospitals in Thailand
Khan Na Yao district